Aristarkh Vasilyevich Lentulov (15 April 1943) was a major Russian avant-garde artist of Cubist orientation who also worked on set designs for the theatre.

Biography 
Aristarkh Lentulov was born in the town of Nizhny Lomov in Penza Oblast, Russia into the family of a rural priest. He studied art in the Penza and Kiev art schools from 1897 to 1905, and then in the private studio of Dmitry Kardovsky in Saint Petersburg in 1906.

He lived in Moscow from 1909, and he was one of the founders of the avant-garde exhibiting association of artists, the Jack of Diamonds group. This group remained active until its dissolution in 1916.

From 1910 to 1911, Lentulov studied at the studio of Henri Le Fauconnier and the Académie de La Palette in Paris. The 1910s were for Lentulov a period of creative productivity and experimentation. He was drawn to Orphism influenced by the French artist Robert Delaunay. Whilst there, he became acquainted with contemporary French painters  such as Albert Gleizes, Jean Metzinger, Fernand Léger and Robert Delaunay and after absorbing fauvists' and cubists' principles, developed his own unique colorful style of painting. Later, after his return to Russia in 1912 he became a major influence on what to become the Russian futurism and in particular Cubo-Futurism. Wassily Kandinsky and Kazimir Malevich were both influenced by him.

Lentulov also formed another group, with Vladimir Mayakovsky and Kazimir Malevich, called Today's Lubock (Segodnyashnii Lubok). They produced satire art that was anti-Austria and anti-Germany. The art pulled inspiration from Russian folklore and lubok art. Lentulov's own art was heavily inspired by traditional and folk Russian architecture.

From pre-revolutionary times, Lentulov was actively involved in various theatrical projects, designing for plays in the Kamerny Theatre (The Merry Wives of Windsor, 1916) and contributing sets for a production of Scriabin's Prometheus in the Bolshoi Theatre in 1919.

In 1928, Lentulov entered into the Society of Moscow artists, which included artists formerly associated with the Jack of Diamonds group. He became chairman of the Society and also started teaching at the Russian state art and technical school (VKhUTEMAS).

Lentulov died in Moscow and is buried in the Vagankovo Cemetery.

Works 

 Saint Basil's Cathedral, 1913, Tretyakov Gallery, Moscow.
 Ringing, 1913, GTG
 Moscow, 1913, GTG;
 In The iverskoy, 1916, GTG;
 View with the red house, 1917;
 Churches. New Jerusalem , 1917;
 Aleksandra Khokhlova, 1919
 Self-portrait with the violin
 Portrait A. 4. Tairova. 1920;
 The cracking of petroleum refinery, 1931, GTG;
 Night on the patriarch ponds, 1928, GTG;
 Passionate area at night, 1928, GRM
 Sunset in the Volga, 1928;
 The sun above the roofs. Rise, 1928;
 Vegetables, 1933, GTG
 Building of the metro over the Lubyanka area, 1936, GTG;

See also
 List of Russian artists

Bibliography 
 Lentulova M., Khudozhnik A. Lentulov. Recollections. M., 1969.
 Aristarkh Lentulov. Catalog of exhibition, M., 1968

References

External links 
Artcyclopedia Links to Lentulov's works
Aristarkh Vasilyevich Lentulov ENCYCLOPÆDIA BRITANNICA

1882 births
1943 deaths
People from Nizhnelomovsky District
People from Nizhnelomovsky Uyezd
19th-century painters from the Russian Empire
Russian male painters
20th-century Russian painters
Russian avant-garde
Russian Futurist painters
19th-century male artists from the Russian Empire
Academic staff of Vkhutemas
Burials at Vagankovo Cemetery
20th-century Russian male artists